Laura Mattarella (born 16 February 1967) is an Italian lawyer who is the current First Lady of Italy. She is the first child and the only daughter of President Sergio Mattarella, who has been in office since 2015.

Biography
Laura Mattarella is the daughter of President Sergio Mattarella and his wife Marisa Chiazzese. A lawyer by profession, she is married to Cosimo Comella. The couple have three children.

First Lady
President Sergio Mattarella is a widower; his wife, Marisa Chiazzese, died in 2012. The First Lady representation functions were then taken on by their daughter, Laura, who immediately accompanied her father on state trips and on visits within Italy.

On the occasion of the 2015 state visit to Vietnam, she attended a series of meetings without her father including a private visit to a school in the poorest part of Ho Chi Minh City.

Honours

Foreign honours
: Grand Cross of the Order of Honour for Services to the Republic of Austria, 1st Class (1 July 2019)
: Order of Friendship (6 October 2021)
: Recipient of the Shohrat Order (18 July 2018)
: Grand Cross of the Order of the Cross of Terra Mariana (2 July 2018)
 : Grand Officer of the Order of the Legion of Honour (5 July 2021)
 : Grand Cross 1st class of the Order of Merit of the Federal Republic of Germany (19 September 2019)
: Grand Cross of the Order of Beneficence (17 January 2017)
: Grand Cross of the Order of the Three Stars (29 June 2018)
: Grand Cross of the Order of Merit (5 July 2018)
 : Knight Grand Cross of the Order of the Crown (9  November 2022)
: Knight Grand Cross of the Order of Merit (6 April 2016)
: Grand Cross of the Order of the Star of Romania (15 October 2018)
: Knight Grand Cross of the Order of Isabella the Catholic (8 November 2021)
: Member Grand Cross of the Royal Order of the Polar Star (13 November 2018)

References

1968 births
Living people
People from Palermo
Grand Crosses 1st class of the Order of Merit of the Federal Republic of Germany
Dames Grand Cross of the Order of Isabella the Catholic
Grand Crosses of the Order of the Crown (Netherlands)
Mattarella family